Sawhatchee Creek is a stream in the U.S. state of Georgia. It is a tributary to Chattahoochee River.

Variant names were "Sawnook Hatchie", "Sowahatchee Creek", "Sowhatchee Creek", "Sowhatchie Creek". Some say Sowahatchee is a name derived from a Native American language meaning "mad river", while others believe it means "raccoon creek".

References

Rivers of Georgia (U.S. state)
Rivers of Early County, Georgia